The Type 84 is an armoured recovery vehicle based on the Type 79 tank, entering service with the PLA Army in 1984. The Type 84 features a powered structure controlling a dozer blade at the front of the hull and a hydraulically powered crane. The crane is capable of lifting up to 70 tons.

The previous variant based on the Type 69 was designated as Type 653.

Users 
 :5 
 
 :18
 
 :5 Type-84A delivered in 2014

See also
WZT

References

Tracked armoured recovery vehicles
Armoured fighting vehicles of the People's Republic of China
Military vehicles introduced in the 1980s